A river rapids ride (or river rafting ride) is an amusement ride that simulates whitewater rafting.

History
The river rapids ride concept was proposed by Bill Crandall (general manager of AstroWorld in Houston) and developed by Intamin. AstroWorld introduced the world's first river rapids ride, Thunder River, in 1980 and popularized a concept which can now be found at most major amusement parks. Despite being an incredibly popular attraction, AstroWorld's Thunder River (being a prototype) was initially plagued by issues that were corrected in the first few seasons of operation. The boat bumpers were re-designed, portions of the wide river channel were narrowed or barricaded to prevent boats from bottle-necking or getting caught in a backflow, and a planned whirlpool effect was scrapped.

Construction
Many modern river rapids rides feature a much narrower river channel as well as smaller boats (6 seats as opposed to 12 seats). Some are heavily themed, while others may present a natural setting for added realism. Multiple manufacturers have introduced new elements to the rapids ride concept: a vertical lift system, shoot the chute-style drops, and a whirlpool feature.

River rapids rides feature circular rafts with two main components: the fiberglass body in which passengers are seated and the rubber ring upon which the body is secured. The rubber ring provides buoyancy as well as shock absorption for when rafts collide with an obstacle during the course of the ride or with each other. Most rafts hold between six and twelve passengers, seated in groups of two or three depending on the manufacturer of the ride. Riders face toward center of the boat and are usually secured by a lap belt. Some rafts feature a circular metal bar in the middle of the raft; this gives passengers a place to grip or brace their feet. Some parks include a space for stowing small items in the center. The floor of the raft body is generally above water level to allow drainage. Most parks require riders to be 36 inches or taller.

Generally, the station starts at the highest point on the ride, with the river channel having a slight gradient to it for the remainder of the ride. A lift hill then brings the boats back up to station level at the end of the ride. This is usually also the point where the ride's main pumps are housed, bringing the water up from the low point and back up to the high point. The gradient on the river channel provides the water with its flow and pace. This also has the interesting side effect such that when the ride's pumps are switched off at the end of operation or in an emergency, the water naturally flows back to the end of the ride where it collects, leaving the majority of the ride's river channel empty and drained until the pumps are turned back on. All Intamin permanent (and most other) river rapids rides feature a connected lake of some sort at the end of the ride before the lift hill. This is sometimes used to store temporarily decommissioned boats. Its main purpose, however, is to help store the large amounts of water that collect at the end of the ride (before the lift hill) once the ride's main pumps are turned off. This is the water that would have been circulating around the ride when it is in operation. When observed, you can usually see the height difference in the water level in this lake from when the rides pumps are turned on, to when they are turned off. This effect is usually less noticeable if an already existing larger lake is used for the ride's water storage. Generally, a longer rapids ride will need a larger lake, as there will be more water to store once the ride's pumps have been turned off. Depending on the size and length of the river rapids ride, it can take up to 15 minutes to fill the ride's channel up from empty once the pumps have been switched on.

The flowing water makes its way over wooden logs or plastic tubes strapped to the base of the river channel, which disrupt the smooth flow of the water, thus providing the ride with its 'rapids'. Most river rapid rides also feature a wave section, where the river channel widens and a wave machine creates waves at a 90 degree angle to the flow of the water and the boats. Rocks are also sometimes bolted to the base of the river channel on metal frames, which helps create a more natural rapids feel.

There are generally two types of river rapids ride stations: those with conveyor belts and those with turntables. Those with conveyor belts are able to lift the raft completely out of the stream of water (usually as an extension of the lift hill at the end of the ride) and advance it to various points in the station to allow passengers to enter and exit via raised straight platforms on either side of the conveyors. Stations that utilize a turntable allow the raft to stay in the stream of water as the turntable continuously revolves, with the rafts wedged between the turntable and a curved surface so that the rafts move at the same speed as the turntable (and not at the same speed as the water). When they reach a certain point around the turntable, the rafts become un-wedged and are released in relatively even intervals to traverse the course.

Historically, axial flow submersible pumps have been the pump of choice for most rides of this type. The small lateral footprint and large vertical water pumping capacity make them perfect for this type of application, being large in vertical size, they fit right into the end of the ride where there is usually a sudden and large change in height from the end of the ride to the station. Some rides, due to their design, have multiple pump units at different locations along the ride. One example is the new Infinity Falls at SeaWorld Orlando. Occasionally, screw pumps have been used too. In the case of axial flow submersible pumps, rides are usually fitted with four; three being used at all times for the safe operation of the ride and a fourth on standby. The pumps are usually rotated in use to even out wear and tear.

Ride layout

After leaving the station, the raft will enter relatively calm waters. After travelling a safe distance (usually 5–15 metres), the raft will enter more turbulent waters. Usually rapids are made by the amusement park having large cylinder tubes underneath the water. The bigger the tube, the bigger the rapids. Along with the rapids, there are often waterfalls.

Finally, there may be pressurized water jets. An automated system may spray streams of water through a nozzle directed toward a passing raft, or on other rides, large amounts of water may shoot from a jet or cannon, often pointed upward so that the falling water will douse riders. Some parks (for instance, Busch Gardens Tampa Bay), have coin-operated water jets and cannons so that passersby can pay to attempt to soak riders.

Safety incidents
On 25 October 2016, a malfunction of the Thunder River Rapids Ride at Dreamworld in Gold Coast, Queensland, Australia, resulted in the deaths of four people. Two were ejected from the ride and two were trapped in the conveyor belt under it. River rapids rides have also had accidents at a number of other theme parks.

On 9 May 2017, an 11-year-old girl, Evha Jannath fell into the water on the Splash Canyon Ride at Drayton Manor Theme Park in Staffordshire, England at around 2:20pm. She was airlifted to Birmingham Children's Hospital but died later in the hospital due to the extent of her injuries. The park was closed from 10 to 12 May to allow the Health and Safety Executive (HSE) to complete their work. The park said this was a mark of respect for her family.

On July 3, 2021, a raft on Raging River at Adventureland in Altoona, Iowa, carrying six passengers overturned, sending four guests to a local hospital with severe injuries. One of the passengers, an 11-year-old boy, later died. The ride was inspected the day before the incident and was found to be in normal working order.

Notable manufacturers

 Barr Engineering
 Bear Rides
 Fabbri Group
 Hafema
 Hopkins Rides
 Interlink
 Intamin
 L&T Systems
 Preston & Barbieri
 Reverchon Industries
 Ride Engineers Switzerland
 SBF Visa Group
 Soquet
 Van Egdom
 Vekoma
 WhiteWater West
 Zamperla

Installations

References

External links
Intamin official website

Rapids
Rafting